Pallone  is the name of several traditional ball games, played in all regions of Italy,

Pallone may also refer to:

 Pallone (surname), surname
 Pallone Azzurro, individual award assigned by the FIGC to the best Italian player 
 Pallone d'Argento, annual award instituted by the Unione Stampa Sportiva Italiana, presented to Italian Serie A players
 Pallone di Cristallo, annual award given to the best player in Sanmarinese football
 Pallone di Gravina, firm, semi-hard, cow's milk cheese from Basilicata and Apulia, Italy

See also 

 Palla (disambiguation)